Vancouver-Little Mountain was a provincial electoral district in the Canadian province of British Columbia. It first appeared on the hustings in the general election of 1966 as a two-member seat. It returned as a two-member seat from 1966 to 1986 and became a one-member seat thereafter. After the 1996 election, the areas it comprised were redistributed. Successor ridings, roughly, are Vancouver-Fraserview, Vancouver-Mount Pleasant, Vancouver-Fairview and Vancouver-Langara.

Demographics

Electoral history 

 
|Liberal
|Edward Charles Sweeney
|align="right"|4,681 	
|align="right"|9.35%
|align="right"|
|align="right"|unknown
 
|Liberal
|Jean Margaret Crowley
|align="right"|4,270 	 	
|align="right"|8.53%
|align="right"|
|align="right"|unknown
|- bgcolor="white"
!align="right" colspan=3|Total valid votes
!align="right"|50,040
!align="right"|100.00%
!align="right"|
|- bgcolor="white"
!align="right" colspan=3|Total rejected ballots
!align="right"|455
!align="right"|
!align="right"|
|- bgcolor="white"
!align="right" colspan=3|Turnout
!align="right"|%
!align="right"|
!align="right"|
|}

 
|Liberal
|Peter Hector Pearse
|align="right"|4,994 	 	
|align="right"|8.90%
|align="right"|
|align="right"|unknown
 
|Liberal
|Robert Harry Beattie
|align="right"|4,851 	 	 	
|align="right"|8.64%
|align="right"|
|align="right"|unknown
|- bgcolor="white"
!align="right" colspan=3|Total valid votes
!align="right"|56,114 	
!align="right"|100.00%
!align="right"|
|- bgcolor="white"
!align="right" colspan=3|Total rejected ballots
!align="right"|345
!align="right"|
!align="right"|
|- bgcolor="white"
!align="right" colspan=3|Turnout
!align="right"|%
!align="right"|
!align="right"|
|}

 
|Liberal
|Richard John Joseph Durante
|align="right"|3,874 		 	
|align="right"|6.57%
|align="right"|
|align="right"|unknown
 
|Liberal
|David Baird Penfield Gibson
|align="right"|3,854 	 		 	
|align="right"|6.54%
|align="right"|
|align="right"|unknown
 
|Progressive Conservative
|Reginald David Grandison
|align="right"|2,358 		
|align="right"|4.00%
|align="right"|
|align="right"|unknown
 
|Progressive Conservative
|William Allan Brown
|align="right"|2,295 	
|align="right"|3.89%
|align="right"|
|align="right"|unknown

|Independent
|David John Bader
|align="right"|253 	 	 	 	
|align="right"|0.43%
|align="right"|
|align="right"|unknown

|Independent
|Gordon James Turner
|align="right"|101 		 	 	 	
|align="right"|0.17%
|align="right"|
|align="right"|unknown
|- bgcolor="white"
!align="right" colspan=3|Total valid votes
!align="right"|58,926
!align="right"|100.00%
!align="right"|
|- bgcolor="white"
!align="right" colspan=3|Total rejected ballots
!align="right"|417
!align="right"|
!align="right"|
|- bgcolor="white"
!align="right" colspan=3|Turnout
!align="right"|%
!align="right"|
!align="right"|
|}

 
|Liberal
|James Bruce Siemens
|align="right"|1,518 	 	 		 	
|align="right"|2.58%
|align="right"|
|align="right"|unknown
 
|Liberal
|Beverley E. Joyce Ballantyne
|align="right"|1,369 	 		 	
|align="right"|2.33%
|align="right"|
|align="right"|unknown
 
|Progressive Conservative
|William Allan Brown
|align="right"|697 	
|align="right"|1.19%
|align="right"|
|align="right"|unknown
 
|Progressive Conservative
|Eric Henry Burgoyne
|align="right"|599 		
|align="right"|1.02%
|align="right"|
|align="right"|unknown
|- bgcolor="white"
!align="right" colspan=3|Total valid votes
!align="right"|58,710
!align="right"|100.00%
!align="right"|
|- bgcolor="white"
!align="right" colspan=3|Total rejected ballots
!align="right"|595
!align="right"|
!align="right"|
|- bgcolor="white"
!align="right" colspan=3|Turnout
!align="right"|%
!align="right"|
!align="right"|
|}

|- bgcolor="white"
!align="right" colspan=3|Total valid votes
!align="right"|71,377
!align="right"|100.00%
!align="right"|
|- bgcolor="white"
!align="right" colspan=3|Total rejected ballots
!align="right"|1,143 
!align="right"|
!align="right"|
|- bgcolor="white"
!align="right" colspan=3|Turnout
!align="right"|%
!align="right"|
!align="right"|
|}

 
|Liberal
|William Pike Hopes
|align="right"|1,600 			 	
|align="right"|1.96%
|align="right"|
|align="right"|unknown
 
|Liberal
|Frank Arthur F.J. Jones
|align="right"|1,381 	 	
|align="right"|1.69%
|align="right"|
|align="right"|unknown
|- bgcolor="white"
!align="right" colspan=3|Total valid votes
!align="right"|81,724  		 
!align="right"|100.00%
!align="right"|
|- bgcolor="white"
!align="right" colspan=3|Total rejected ballots
!align="right"|805
!align="right"|
!align="right"|
|- bgcolor="white"
!align="right" colspan=3|Turnout
!align="right"|%
!align="right"|
!align="right"|
|}

 
|Liberal
|Arthur John Lee
|align="right"|10,627 		 	
|align="right"|13.04%
|align="right"|
|align="right"|unknown
 
|Liberal
|Joyce E. Statton
|align="right"|5,498 	 		 	 		
|align="right"|6.75%
|align="right"|
|align="right"|unknown

|- bgcolor="white"
!align="right" colspan=3|Total valid votes
!align="right"|81,499
!align="right"|100.00%
!align="right"|
|- bgcolor="white"
!align="right" colspan=3|Total rejected ballots
!align="right"|1,219
!align="right"|
!align="right"|
|- bgcolor="white"
!align="right" colspan=3|Turnout
!align="right"|%
!align="right"|
!align="right"|
|}

|Liberal
|Michael K. Stebner
|align="right"|8,180 		 	
|align="right"|35.79%
|align="right"|
|align="right"|unknown
 

|Independent
|Cheryl M. Maczko
|align="right"|90		 			 	
|align="right"|0.39%
|align="right"|
|align="right"|unknown
|- bgcolor="white"
!align="right" colspan=3|Total valid votes
!align="right"|22,856
!align="right"|100.00%
!align="right"|
|- bgcolor="white"
!align="right" colspan=3|Total rejected ballots
!align="right"|562
!align="right"|
!align="right"|
|- bgcolor="white"
!align="right" colspan=3|Turnout
!align="right"|69.44%
!align="right"|
!align="right"|
|- bgcolor="white"
!align="right" colspan=7|1  Seat reduced to one member from two.
|}

After the 1996 election the Vancouver-Little Mountain riding was redistributed. Successor ridings, roughly, are Vancouver-Fraserview, Vancouver-Mount Pleasant, Vancouver-Fairview and Vancouver-Langara.

Sources 

Elections BC Historical Returns

Former provincial electoral districts of British Columbia